"Smoke in the Forest" (Dym v lesu, Дым в лесу) is a short story by the Soviet children's writer Arkady Gaidar, first published in No.2, February 1939, issue of Pioneer magazine. Later that year it was published by Detizdat Publishers as a separate book with illustrations by P.Yermolayev. In 1940 Gaidar included it into his compilation Rasskazy (Short Stories). In 1955, Yevgeny Karelov shot a film Smoke in the Forest, based upon Gaidar's story.

Plot summary
Saboteurs (referred to as 'belogvardeitsy', the 'White Guardians') set fire to the forest with the purpose of destroying the factory nearby. Pilot Fedoseyev, sent over with the reconnaissance mission fails to return in time. Volodya (the protagonist, a boy of 11) with Fenya (5) and her mother (pilot Fedoseyev's daughter and wife, respectively), travel in a lorry to the aerodrome. 

While playing with Brutik (a puppy who's tagged along behind them), the boy gets lost. Rushing through the forest, he suddenly runs into injured pilot Fedoseyev whose plane, as it happens, has been shot down by the enemy. Sent back to the aerodrome, the boy gets lost again, then sets out to swim across the river and all but drowns, being in the end saved miraculously by a sheep-dog Lutta and the Red Army men following her. Brutik, though, while crossing the river, dies.

Quotes
 Should we not have fed him that sweet, he wouldn't have tagged along behind us. – Fenya, pitying Brutik, a puppy who's drowned.But then who knows, may be knackers would have come after him, hook him up, thrown into a cage and skin him. Such death – would it have been better? – Volodya (trying to make his young friend to see the brighter side of things):
 As for what they make in this factory, me and Fenya, we don't know. But should we knew, we'd tell nobody except for just one person – Comrade Voroshilov. (The story's finale)

References

1939 short stories
1939 children's books
Short stories by Arkady Gaidar
Children's short stories
Russian children's books